The 1975 Greenlandic Women's Handball Championship (also known as the  or ) was the first edition of the Greenlandic Women's Handball Championship. It was held in Nuuk. It was won by NÛK.

Venues 
The championship was played at the Godthåbhallen in Nuuk.

Table

Results

References 

1975
Handball - Women